Frederick Joseph "Fred" Noonan (born April 4, 1893 – disappeared July 2, 1937, declared dead June 20, 1938) was an American flight navigator, sea captain and aviation pioneer, who first charted many commercial airline routes across the Pacific Ocean during the 1930s. Navigator for Amelia Earhart, they disappeared somewhere over the Central Pacific Ocean, on July 2, 1937 during one of the last legs of their attempted pioneering round-the-world flight.

Early life
Fred Noonan was born in Cook County, Illinois to Joseph T. Noonan (born Lincolnville, Maine, in 1861) and Catherine Egan (born London, England), both of Irish descent. Noonan's mother died when he was four, and three years later a census report lists his father as living alone in a Chicago boarding house. Relatives or family friends were likely looking after Noonan. In his own words, Noonan "left school in summer of 1905 and went to Seattle, Washington," where he found work as a seaman.

Maritime career
At the age of 17, Noonan shipped out of Seattle as an ordinary seaman on a British sailing bark, the Crompton. Between 1910 and 1915, Noonan worked on over a dozen ships, rising to the ratings of quartermaster and bosun's mate. He continued working on merchant ships throughout World War I. Serving as an officer on ammunition ships, his harrowing wartime service included being on three vessels that were sunk from under him by U-boats. After the war, Noonan continued in the Merchant Marine and achieved a measure of prominence as a ship's officer. Throughout the 1920s, his maritime career was characterized by steadily increasing ratings and "good" (typically the highest) work performance reviews. Noonan married Josephine Sullivan in 1927 at Jackson, Mississippi. After a honeymoon in Cuba, they settled in New Orleans.

Navigator for Pan Am
Following a distinguished 22-year career at sea, which included sailing around Cape Horn seven times (three times under sail), Noonan contemplated a new career direction. After learning to fly in the late 1920s, he received a "limited commercial pilot's license" in 1930, on which he listed his occupation as "aviator." In the following year, he was awarded marine license #121190, "Class Master, any ocean," the qualifications of a merchant ship's captain. During the early 1930s, he worked for Pan American World Airways as a navigation instructor in Miami and an airport manager in Port-au-Prince, Haiti, eventually assuming the duties of inspector for all of the company's airports.

In March 1935, Noonan was the navigator on the first Pan Am Sikorsky S-42 clipper at San Francisco Bay. In April he navigated the historic round-trip China Clipper flight between San Francisco and Honolulu, piloted by Ed Musick (who was featured on the cover of Time magazine that year). Noonan was subsequently responsible for mapping Pan Am's clipper routes across the Pacific Ocean, participating in many flights to Midway Island, Wake Island, Guam, the Philippines, and Hong Kong. In addition to more modern navigational tools, Noonan as a licensed sea captain was known for carrying a ship's sextant on these flights.

1937 was a year of transition for Fred Noonan, whose reputation as an expert navigator, along with his role in the development of commercial airline navigation, had already earned him a place in aviation history. The tall, very thin, dark auburn-haired and blue-eyed 43-year-old navigator was living in Los Angeles. He resigned from Pan Am because he felt he had risen through the ranks as far as he could as a navigator, and he had an interest in starting a navigation school. In March, he divorced his wife Josephine in Ciudad Juárez, Mexico. Two weeks later, he married Mary Beatrice Martinelli (née Passadori) of Oakland, California. Noonan was rumored to be a heavy drinker. That was fairly common during this era and there is no contemporary evidence Noonan was an alcoholic, although decades later, a few writers and others made some hearsay claims that he was.

Earhart world flight and disappearance
Amelia Earhart met Noonan through mutual connections in the Los Angeles aviation community and chose him to serve as her navigator on her World Flight in the Lockheed Electra 10E that she had purchased with funds donated by Purdue University. She planned to circumnavigate the globe at equatorial latitudes. Although this aircraft was of an advanced type for its time, and was dubbed a "flying laboratory" by the press, little real science was planned. The world was already crisscrossed by commercial airline routes (many of which Noonan himself had first navigated and mapped), and the flight is now regarded by some as an adventurous publicity stunt for Earhart's gathering public attention for her next book. Noonan was probably attracted to this project because Earhart's mass market fame would almost certainly generate considerable publicity, which in turn might reasonably be expected to attract attention to him and the navigation school that he hoped to establish when they returned.

The first attempt began with a record-breaking flight from Burbank, California, to Honolulu. However, while the Electra was taking off to begin its second leg to Howland Island, its wing clipped the ground. Earhart cut an engine off to maintain balance, the aircraft ground looped, and its landing gear collapsed. Although there were no injuries, the Lockheed Electra had to be shipped back to Los Angeles by sea for expensive repairs. Over one month later, they tried starting again, this time leaving California in the opposite (eastward) direction.

Earhart characterized the pace of their 40-day, eastward trip from Burbank to New Guinea as "leisurely". After completing about 22,000 miles (35,000 km) of the journey, they took off from Lae on July 2, 1937, and headed for Howland Island, a tiny sliver of land in the Pacific Ocean, barely 2,000 meters long. Their plan for the 18-hour-long flight was to reach the vicinity of Howland using Noonan's celestial navigation abilities and then find Howland by using radio signals transmitted by the U.S. Coast Guard cutter USCGC Itasca.

Through a combined sequence of misunderstandings or mishaps (that are still controversial), over scattered clouds, the final approach to Howland Island failed, although Earhart stated by radio that they believed they were in the immediate vicinity of Howland. The strength of the transmissions received indicated that Earhart and Noonan were indeed in the vicinity of Howland island, but could not find it and after numerous more attempts it appeared that the connection had dropped. The last transmission received from Earhart indicated she and Noonan were flying along a line of position (taken from a "sun line" running on 157–337 degrees) which Noonan would have calculated and drawn on a chart as passing through Howland. Two-way radio contact was never established, and the aviators and their aircraft disappeared somewhere over the Central Pacific Ocean. Despite an unprecedented, extensive search by the U.S. Navy—including the use of search aircraft from an aircraft carrier—and the U.S. Coast Guard, no traces of them or their Electra were ever found.

Later research showed that Howland's position was misplaced on their chart by approximately five nautical miles. There is also some motion picture evidence to suggest that a belly antenna on their Electra might have snapped on takeoff (the purpose of this antenna has not been identified, however radio communications seemed normal as they climbed away from Lae). One relatively new theory suggests that Noonan may have made a mistake in navigation due to the flight's crossing of the International Date Line. However, this theory is based entirely on supposition and misunderstanding of astronomy, it does not offer any evidence Noonan was impacted by or failed to adequately account for the 24 hour variance in his sun line calculations, was debunked by experienced navigator on TIGHAR forum.

Theories on disappearance

Many researchers, including navigator and aeronautical engineer Elgen Long, believe that the Electra ran out of fuel and that Earhart and Noonan ditched at sea. The "crash and sink" theory is the most widely accepted explanation of Earhart's and Noonan's fate.

In her last message received at Howland Island, Earhart reported that they were flying a standard position line (or sun line), a routine procedure for an experienced navigator like Noonan. This line passed within sight of Gardner Island (now called Nikumaroro) in the Phoenix Island Group to the southeast, and there is a range of documented, archaeological, and anecdotal evidence supporting the hypothesis that Earhart and Noonan found Gardner Island, uninhabited at the time, landed the Electra on a flat reef near the wreck of a freighter, and sent sporadic radio messages from there. Ric Gillespie, author of Finding Amelia, wrote that while listening to an alleged radio signal from on her home radio in Florida, a teenager named Betty Klenck heard the distressed woman say, "George, get the suitcase in my closet...California." Four years earlier, in a letter to her mother, Earhart had asked that, should anything ever happen to her, the suitcase of private papers stored in her closet in California be destroyed. It has been surmised that Earhart and Noonan might have survived on Nikumaroro for some time before dying as castaways. In 1940, Gerald Gallagher, a British colonial officer and a licensed pilot, radioed his superiors to tell them that he believed he had found Earhart's skeleton, along with a sextant box, under a tree on the island's southeast corner. Although Noonan required and used a sextant for celestial navigation, this artifact has been connected to an American naval survey vessel that visited Gardner Island in 1939, a year before it was recovered. In a 1998 report to the American Anthropological Association, researchers, including a forensic anthropologist and an archaeologist, concluded, "What we can be certain of is that bones were found on the island in 1939–40, associated with what were observed to be women's shoes and a navigator's sextant box, and that the morphology of the recovered bones, insofar as we can tell by applying contemporary forensic methods to measurements taken at the time, appears consistent with a female of Earhart's height and ethnic origin. However, the bones themselves have been lost since they were examined by Dr. D.W. Hoodless on Fiji in 1940. A subsequent study published in 2018 also made similar claims as those presented in 1998. Neither study had the benefit of actually examining the long lost bones as did Hoodless. Typically, forensic anthropologists, like all scientists, base their conclusions on their own examinations. Hoodless' examination methods and original conclusions that the bones belonged to man have been upheld by reputable modern researchers.

Contradictory research has recently been advanced; it is possible to set course for and see Gardner from a point on the over Howland sunline (passing seven miles east of), but one does not simply reach Gardner by following such a line. A position line is part of a circle circumference and may be considered a straight line only for limited distances. The Sun's azimuth change per hour is about 15 arcdegrees, whereas the Howland-to-Gardner flight (409 statute miles) would have taken 2 hours 55 minutes (at 140 mph). As a result, the aircraft, when having followed the LOP by astronavigation, would have passed far northward of Gardner when reaching its meridian. The "Gardner" hypothesis originates from a 1980s book where navigator Paul Rafford, Jr.  "fell off his chair when seeing that the position line points in the direction of Gardner Island". Apart from such supposition, it was with the available fuel reserves (45 gallons) impossible to reach Gardner from the Howland region: the route would have taken 120 U.S. gallons at least.

The author of an article in Journal of Navigation, Vol. 9, No. 3, December 2011, avers that due to insufficient fuel reserves from 1912 GMT, no land other than Howland itself and Baker at 45 miles could be reached. With a maximum ferry range of 2,740 statute miles, even the closest islands Winslow Reef and McKean Island at 210 and 350 miles away respectively, were unreachable.

Joe Lodrige, an experienced pilot and navigator, did extensive research, and his analysis put the aircraft east of Howland. His theory is based on an error in Noonan's position when he took his Sun line of position. The angle of the sun was almost on the horizon, as it was just coming up. Lodrige is able to position the aircraft more accurately based on wind data. With this better position, his Sun line puts the crew too far east. Thus, when they flew the distance required, and then turned 90 degrees SE on course, they never found the island. Lodrige puts their final crash position as 0°10'N 175°55'W, which is in the water at 65 miles
Southeast of Howland and 39 miles East of Baker.

Ocean explorer Robert Ballard led a 2019 expedition to locate Earhart's Electra or evidence that it landed on Nikumaroro as supposed by the Gardner/Nikumaroro hypothesis. After days of searching the deep cliffs supporting the island and the nearby ocean using state of the art equipment and technology, Ballard did not find any evidence of the plane or any associated wreckage of it. Allison Fundis, Ballard's Chief Operating Officer of the expedition stated, “We felt like if her plane was there, we would have found it pretty early in the expedition.”

In popular culture
Although Fred Noonan has left a much smaller mark in popular culture than Amelia Earhart's, his legacy is remembered sporadically. Noonan is often mentioned in W.P. Kinsella's novels. Noonan was portrayed by actor David Graf in "The 37s", an episode of Star Trek: Voyager. The character of an aircraft pilot named Fred Noonan is portrayed by actor Eddie Firestone in The Long Train, a 1961 episode of the television series The Untouchables. Both a baseball stadium and an aircraft rental agency are named after Fred Noonan. A 1990 episode of Unsolved Mysteries featured Mark Stitham as Noonan. In addition, Rutger Hauer has portrayed Noonan in the TV movie Amelia Earhart: The Final Flight (1994) starring Diane Keaton, and Christopher Eccleston portrayed Noonan in the 2009 biographical movie Amelia (2009).

Fred Noonan is mentioned in the song "Amelia" on Bell X1's 2009 album Blue Lights on the Runway, which contemplates the last moments and the fates of Amelia Earhart and Noonan. The first ballad written about Amelia and Fred was written and sung by "Red River" Dave McEnerney in 1938 called "Amelia Earhart's Last Flight". Antje Duvekot's Song "Ballad of Fred Noonan"  on her 2012 album "New Siberia" imagines Noonan's unrequited and unremembered love for Earhart. The controversy over Earhart and Noonan's disappearance was discussed in the song "The True Story of Amelia Earhart" on Plainsong's album "In Search of Amelia Earhart." Noonan and Earhart's fate is also considered in the song "Amelia" by Mark Kelly's Marathon, the opening single from the 2020 eponymous album by Mark Kelly (keyboardist) from Marillion. Noonan is a main character in Jane Mendelsohn's novel, I Was Amelia Earhart (1996), and in Neal Bowers' poem "The Noonan Variations" (The Sewanee Review, Volume CXVIII, 1990).

See also
 Air navigation
 Amelia Earhart
 List of people who disappeared mysteriously at sea
 USCGC Itasca (1929)

References

Notes

Citations

Bibliography

 Goldstein, Donald M. and Katherine V. Dillon. Amelia: The Centennial Biography of an Aviation Pioneer. Washington, DC: Brassey's, 1997. .
 Long, Elgen M. and Marie K. Amelia Earhart: The Mystery Solved. New York: Simon & Schuster, 1999. .
 Lovell, Mary S. The Sound of Wings. New York: St. Martin's Press, 1989. .
 Rich, Doris L. Amelia Earhart: A Biography. Washington, DC: Smithsonian Institution Press, 1989. .

External links
 Frederick J. Noonan, Pioneer aviator– Navigator
 Fred Noonan, Sea Captain

1893 births
1930s missing person cases
1938 deaths
Amelia Earhart
American aviators
American aviation record holders
American navigators
American sailors
American people of English descent
Flight navigators
Missing aviators
People declared dead in absentia
People from Cook County, Illinois
Victims of aviation accidents or incidents in 1937